Raymond F. Paloutzian is a professor of psychology (emeritus) at Westmont College in Santa Barbara, California. For many years he edited the International Journal for the Psychology of Religion. Paloutzian's main fields of scholarship are social psychology and the psychology of religion. In the latter he is the author of an introductory textbook, and the lead editor of two handbooks.

Biography 

Raymond Frank Paloutzian was born on 6 June 1945 in Fresno, California.

Paloutzian received a PhD in 1972 in Social Psychology from Claremont Graduate University.

Paloutzian was married to Ann Taves on 29 December 2007, in Santa Barbara.

Selected works

References 

1945 births
Living people
American social psychologists
Psychologists of religion
Westmont College faculty